The Norwegian Red Cross Search and Rescue Corps (NRKH) was created in 1932 as a support for civil society in the event of war, and particularly with gas attacks in other cities. 

Today, there are over 300 local Search and Rescue Corps with over 12,000 members, where all members are qualified first aiders.

The Search and Rescue Corps's main task is to assist police in search and rescue operations especially during disasters. In addition, the corps gives medical manpower to various events in the community, doing first aid instruction, and in some locations, ambulance services.

All efforts from the membership are voluntary. The equipment used is also paid for with funds collected through volunteer efforts.

Education 
Anyone who wants to be an active member in the corps must complete a basic course in first aid and introduction to Red Cross. They can then participate as an aspirant. When they have completed their full training of First Aid, Radio Communications, and Basic course in Search and Rescue, they are qualified members. After that, they can do more specialized training such as ATV Operations, Snowmobile Operations, Boating and water rescue, expert First Aid, Team Leader SAR, Operations Leader SAR, Ambulance Training and much more.

All members must pass a practical and theoretical examination in first aid and do a reassessment of all subjects every three years. 

To be included in search and rescue operations, it is also required to train or have documented skills in outdoor activities, and search methods for summer and winter conditions. In addition, there are courses in water rescue, rescue in difficult terrain, the avalanche rescue, communications, advanced first aid, make-up and the cursor service, management, psychological first aid, ambulance and more.

External links 
Norwegian Red Cross
Rescue
Volunteer search and rescue organizations
Norwegian Red Cross